NGC 6753 is a massive unbarred spiral galaxy, seen almost exactly face-on, in the southern constellation of Pavo. It was discovered by the English astronomer John Herschel on July 5, 1836. It does not display any indications of a recent interaction with another galaxy or cluster.

The morphological class of NGC 6753 is (R)SA(r)b, indicating it is a spiral without an inner bar feature (SA), displaying outer (R) and inner (r) ring structures, and moderately wound spiral arms. It is being viewed nearly face-on with a galactic plane inclination by 30° to the line of sight from the Earth. The galaxy is flocculent in appearance with a prominent central region. It has a star formation rate of ·yr−1, which is confined to a radius of  around the core. The most active region of star formation is the inner ring.

Up to three supernovae have been discovered in this galaxy. The candidate type II-P supernova SN 2019mhm was discovered by the BOSS team on August 2, 2019. This transient was spotted close to maximum with a magnitude of 16.6, but showed no radio emission. Supernova SN 2000cj was discovered  by Robert Evans on May 14, 2000. The spectrum showed this to be a type Ia supernova. On May 13, 2005, type Ic supernovae SN 2005cb was spotted by the Brazilian Supernovae Search team.

References

External links
 
 

6753
Unbarred spiral galaxies
Pavo (constellation)